Stephen David Barber (February 22, 1938 – February 4, 2007) was an American Major League Baseball (MLB) left-handed pitcher. He pitched for the Baltimore Orioles and six other teams from 1960 to 1974. Barber spent his first eight years with the Orioles, where he compiled an outstanding 95–75 record. Arm injuries hampered the rest of his career which saw him win only 26 and lose 31 for the rest of his 15-year career. While with the Orioles, Barber was an All-Star for two seasons. From 1961 to 1967, Barber bucked baseball superstition by wearing number 13. He also wore this number with the Seattle Pilots.

Early years
Barber was born in Takoma Park, Maryland, and graduated in 1956 from Montgomery Blair High School located in Silver Spring in Montgomery County, Maryland.

Major League career
Barber signed with the Orioles in 1957. In , he tied for the AL lead in shutouts with eight, and had a record of 18–12 with a 3.33 ERA in 37 games (34 starts). In , he became the first modern Orioles' pitcher to win 20 games in a season when he compiled a 20–13 record, 180 strikeouts, and a 2.75 ERA in 39 games (36 starts), which led to him being selected as an American League All-Star for the first time in his career. However, tendinitis in his elbow prevented him from appearing in the game, and also kept him out of the 1966 World Series as the Orioles swept the defending champion Los Angeles Dodgers in four games for the first title in franchise history. On April 30, 1967, Barber was removed from a game against the Detroit Tigers with two outs in the ninth inning after having given up two runs despite having not surrendered a hit; Stu Miller got the final out to complete the no-hitter, although the Orioles lost 2–1.

Barber spent the rest of his career plagued by elbow troubles. The Orioles traded him to the New York Yankees on July 4, 1967, for players to be named later, Ray Barker and cash. Later that year, on December 15, the Yankees sent minor-leaguers Chet Trail and Daniel Brady to the Orioles to complete the trade.

Barber was selected by the Seattle Pilots in the 1968 Major League Baseball expansion draft when the Yankees left him unprotected. Plagued by a sore arm, he worked in 25 games (16 starts) for the  Pilots, going 4–7 with a 4.80 ERA. He was released just before the 1970 season, but played that year for the Chicago Cubs, and then for the Atlanta Braves, pitching almost exclusively in relief. He remained with the Braves until they released him in May 1972, then joined the California Angels, where he remained until the end of the 1973 season. Barber was involved in a nine-player transaction when he was sent along with Clyde Wright, Ken Berry, Art Kusnyer and cash from the Angels to the Milwaukee Brewers for Ellie Rodríguez, Ollie Brown, Joe Lahoud, Skip Lockwood and Gary Ryerson on October 23, 1973. After being released by the Brewers during spring training, he later appeared in 13 games for the San Francisco Giants in the middle of the 1974 season. In August, he signed with the St. Louis Cardinals, but never pitched for the team.

In 466 MLB games pitched, including 272 as a starter, Barber posted a 121–106 won–lost mark and a 3.36 earned run average. He registered 59 complete games and 21 shutouts. He also had 14 saves as a relief pitcher. He allowed 1,818 hits and 950 bases on balls in 1,999 innings pitched, with 1,309 strikeouts.

Later years and death
Barber and his wife moved to the Las Vegas area in 1978. He was employed as a driver for the Clark County School District, providing transportation for children with disabilities from 1992 to 2006. Barber died of pneumonia in Henderson, Nevada on February 4, 2007.

References

External links

Steve Barber at Baseballbiography.com
ESPN: Barber, O's first 20-game winner, dies at 67

1938 births
2007 deaths
Aberdeen Pheasants players
Amarillo Gold Sox players
American League All-Stars
Atlanta Braves players
Baltimore Orioles players
Baseball players from Maryland
California Angels players
Chicago Cubs players
Deaths from pneumonia in Nevada
Major League Baseball pitchers
New York Yankees players
Phoenix Giants players
People from Takoma Park, Maryland
Richmond Braves players
San Francisco Giants players
Seattle Pilots players
Syracuse Chiefs players
Tulsa Oilers (baseball) players